Constantia van Lynden (1761-1831) was a Dutch noblewoman. She is known as the love interest of William V, Prince of Orange, who courted her in 1779-1782, which caused a scandal and attracted attention in contemporary Netherlands. The affair was used as propaganda by the Patriottentijd for political reasons and she was portrayed as potentially politically influential.

References
 Gedenkschriften van Gijsbert Jan van Hardenbroek, heer van Bergestein ... enz. (1747-1787), uitgegeven en toegelicht door F.J.L. Krämer. Amsterdam, 1901-1918. 6 delen. Deel I, p. 515-516; deel II, p. 68, 194.

18th-century Dutch women
19th-century Dutch women
Dutch nobility
1761 births
1831 deaths